Sirdar Shir Ahmad Sura-i-Milli served as Prime Minister of the Kingdom of Afghanistan from October 25, 1927, to January 1929. He was succeeded by Shir Giyan after being deposed. He was born circa 1885.

References

Prime Ministers of Afghanistan
20th-century Afghan politicians
1880s births
20th-century deaths
Year of death missing